1977 in Korea may refer to:
1977 in North Korea
1977 in South Korea